Talcher road railway station is a railway station which is about  from Talcher. It is a satellite railway station of Talcher town. Talcher railway station is located in the city premises and is terminus railway station.

History
Talcher road railway station developed during the expansion of industrial carriageway and corridor of NALCO Aluminium Plant, FCI and NTPC. A double track was already present up to Talcher Town for facilitation of movement of coal. The Talcher–Sambalpur rail line constituted in year 1987 ended its final works in 1996 became operational in 1998. The station came up in 1992 and henceforth gained a lot of importance.

Services
Talcher road railway station has over 5000 passengers traffic daily and 42 trains UP/DOWN pass through the station. Talcher Puri Fast Passenger originates here.

It is situated on the Cuttack–Sambalpur line section of East Coast railway line which is a major route connecting Mumbai to Bhubaneswar of India. Talcher road is connected to Mumbai, Delhi, Kolkata, Surat, Pune, Ahmedabad, Bhubaneswar, Rourkela, Nagpur, Vishakhapatnam, Amritsar, Raipur, Cuttack, Puri, Sambalpur, Berhampur.

Ongoing projects
 Talcher–Bimlagarh
 Talcher Road–Sambalpur rail tracks doubling.

References

External links
http://indiarailinfo.com/departures/angul-angl/241
http://asrl.in/
http://www.eastcoastrail.indianrailways.gov.in/

Railway stations in Angul district
Khurda Road railway division